Cynodonichthys elegans is a species of killifish from the family Rivulidae which is found in temporary pools in the Cauca River basin and in the San Juan River in the Chocó Department in Colombia.

See also 
 List of fishes in the Magdalena River
 List of data deficient fishes

References

External links 

Rivulidae
Endemic fauna of Colombia
Freshwater fish of Colombia
Magdalena River
Taxa named by Franz Steindachner
Fish described in 1880